The 1920 Oklahoma A&M Aggies football team represented Oklahoma A&M College in the 1920 college football season. This was the 20th year of football at A&M and the second under Jim Pixlee. The Aggies played their home games at Lewis Field in Stillwater, Oklahoma. They finished the season 0–7–1, 0–3 in the Southwest Conference.

Schedule

References

Oklahoma AandM
Oklahoma State Cowboys football seasons
College football winless seasons
Oklahoma AandM Aggies football